Kelli Shean Rackley (born 10 September 1987) is a golfer from South Africa. She graduated from the University of Arkansas in 2011. She married Chandler Rackley of Little Rock, Arkansas, in June 2011. They moved back to Little Rock, where she currently coaches at her own Academy, "More Than a Game Golf Academy".

History and family 
Shean was born in Cape Town, South Africa to Stephen and Dianne Shean. She has two older brothers, Gary and Trevor, and an older sister, Desray.

Amateur career 
Shean had a successful amateur career in South Africa.

In 2005, she achieved the following:
Finished 2nd along with Ashleigh Simon in the Spirit International Team Championships in Women's Division
Runner-up as South African Team in the World Division
Runner-up South African Amateur Stroke Play Championships
Won South Africa Amateur Match Play Championships
Won Order of Merit for Ernie Els Junior Tour with 2 wins, 3 runners-up, and one 3rd-place finish

In 2006, she won all of the following:
World Amateur Team Championships
Gauteng Open Match Play Championships
Southern Cape Open Championships
Kwa-Zulu Natal Open Championships by a record 11 shots
Western Province Open Championships by a record 12 shots

Collegiate career 
Shean came to the University of Arkansas on a golf scholarship in 2007 and participated in every tournament while attending the university. Her first collegiate win came in 2009 at Marilynn Smith Sunflower Invitational in Kansas where she finished 7 under par.

Professional career 
Shean participated in her first LPGA event in September 2009 as an amateur. She tied for 27th in the P&G Beauty NW Arkansas Championship.

Shean competed in the 2010 U.S. Women's Open as her second professional event, placing 65th. She was leading the majority of the first round, where she gained most of her publicity.

Team appearances
Amateur
Espirito Santo Trophy (representing South Africa): 2006 (winners), 2010

References

External links 
 Women's Golf South Africa
 Arkansas Razorback Women's Golf
 Golf Stat Arkansas Women's Golf

South African female golfers
Arkansas Razorbacks women's golfers
1987 births
Living people